Huajicori is both a municipality and the municipal seat of the same in the Mexican state of Nayarit.  The population of the municipality was 10,294 in 2000 in a total area of 2,603.5 km².  Its area makes up almost 10% of the state.  The population of the town was 2,201 (2005).

Huajicori is located 180 km north of the state capital Tepic, 125 km north of Santiago Ixcuintla, and 19 km northwest of Acaponeta.  It is bounded in the north by the municipality of Pueblo Nuevo, Durango; in the south with the municipality of Acaponeta, in the west with the municipality of Escuinapa, in the state of Sinaloa; in the northwest with the municipality of Rosario, state of Sinaloa. The Río de las Cañas forms the boundary between the states of Nayarit and Sinaloa.

The name comes from the Cora word “Huaxi-imi”, (peyote) and “Huac”, which is the denomination “a lot of peyote”; so Huajicori means the place  “Where there is a lot of peyote”.

The economy is based on subsistence farming and cattle raising. The main crops are corn, beans, jamaica, and fruit trees.

Climate

References

Enciclopedia de los Municipios de México
Instituto Nacional de Estadística, Geografia, e Informática

Populated places in Nayarit
Municipalities of Nayarit